The Cyprus Association of Actuaries (CAA) is the association of actuaries in Cyprus. The association was founded in 1991 and formally established in 1993. It is a full member of the International Actuarial Association and the Groupe Consultatif. As of 2009, the association has 48 fellows.

External links

Cyprus Association of Actuaries official website

Actuarial associations